Cosmas I or Kosmas I served as Greek Patriarch of Alexandria between c. 727 and his death in 768.

Cosmas was the first residential Chalcedonian (Melkite) patriarch to be established in Alexandria following the Muslim conquest of Egypt in the 640s. The see had remained vacant since, but Cosmas was appointed with the consent of both the Umayyad Caliph and the Byzantine Emperor. The chronicler Theophanes the Confessor reports that in 742/3, he abjured Monotheletism, the dominant doctrine among Alexandrian Melkites since it had been promulgated by Emperor Heraclius. As Cosmas himself was most likely not a Monothelete, this has been interpreted by modern scholarship as a garbled reference to Alexandria's recognition by the other Chalcedonian patriarchates.

References

Sources
 

768 deaths
8th-century Patriarchs of Alexandria
8th-century people from the Abbasid Caliphate
Christians from the Umayyad Caliphate
8th-century people from the Umayyad Caliphate